Shipra Goyal  is an Indian singer, popular for her songs like "Ishq Bulava", "Angreji Wali Madam", "Ungli", "Tutti Bole Wedding Di", "Yadaan Teriyaan", "Lovely VS PU", "Mainu Ishq Lagaa" and "Paro".

Early life 

Though her paternal roots are in Mansa, Punjab, India. She was born and brought up in Delhi and belongs to a musical family. Her parents, Subhash and Anju Goyal are renowned Singers from Delhi. She started singing at a very early age and gathered various experiences while attending her parents live shows and recordings. In her school life she was among bright students,  Not only in Academics but in music competitions also. Topped her school in 12th standard Board Exams (Arts) and participated in her 1st music competition when studying in 6th standard, for this she won 1st prize on State-level.  She has completed Graduation in Indian Classical Music.

Career 

All the experience she gained performing in competitions, helped her in doing her first show when she was studying in 12th standard. A regular name in Delhi's music circle, thought of shifting to Mumbai to pursue her career in Bollywood playback singing when she turned 21 years old. After completing her graduation in classical music from Hindu College (Delhi) she then moved to Mumbai in 2013, and soon made her debut with Vishal–Shekhar's 'Ishq Bulaava' since then she has sung many songs in Bollywood and Pollywood.

Discography

Singles

Duo collaboration

Soundtrack album

Filmography

Awards and nominations 

Won the Best Duet Vocalist award for "Naraan" (PTC Punjabi Music Awards 2018).
Nominated in the category of Best Duet Vocalist for "Lovely Vs PU" alongside singer Ravinder Grewal (PTC Punjab Music Awards 2015.
Nominated in the category of Best Female Singer for "Hatthan VIch Luk Luk Ke" (Mirchi Music Awards Punjabi 2014).
Nominated in the category of Most Popular Song Of The Year for "Goreyan Nu Daffa Karo" (PTC Punjabi Film Awards 2015).
Nominated in the category of Best Female Playback Singer for "Mainu Ishq Lagga" (Mirchi Music Awards Punjabi 2015).
Nominated in the category of Best Female Playback Singer for "Mainu Ishq Lagga" (PTC Punjabi Film Awards 2016).

References

External links 
 Shipra Goyal in Bombay Times 
 Shipra Goyal in Delhi Times 
 Hungama 
Newstomark

1991 births
Living people
Singers from Mumbai
Bollywood playback singers
Indian women pop singers
21st-century Indian singers
Punjabi people
Indian women playback singers
21st-century Indian women singers
Women musicians from Maharashtra